American singer-songwriter Chris Stapleton has released four studio albums, one EP, 15 singles, six promotional singles, and three music videos. His debut solo album, Traveller, was released on May 5, 2015, by Mercury Nashville. It reached number one on the US Billboard 200 and was certified triple platinum by the Recording Industry Association of America (RIAA) and gold by Music Canada. Its album track "Tennessee Whiskey" was certified quadruple Platinum in the US and reached the top 20 on the Billboard Hot 100, while the single "Nobody to Blame" reached the top 10 on the US Country Airplay chart. Stapleton's second studio album From A Room: Volume 1 was released on May 5, 2017, and Volume 2, on December 1. Traveller and Volume 1 were the best-selling country albums of 2016 and 2017, respectively. Volume 1 and Volume 2 both debuted at number two on the Billboard 200.

Traveller, From A Room: Volume 1, and Volume 2 held the top-three spots on the Top Country Albums chart dated February 10, 2018, making Stapleton the first artist to do so since Garth Brooks in 1992. "Broken Halos" became his first single to top the Country Airplay chart.

Studio albums

Extended plays

Singles

As lead artist

As featured artist

Promotional singles

Other charted and certified songs

Other appearances

Songwriting credits
The following is a list with selected songs written by Stapleton and recorded by other artists.

Music videos

Notes

References

D
S
S